Giuliano Carnimeo (born Carmineo; 4 July 1932 – 10 September 2016) was an Italian director and screenwriter, sometimes credited as Anthony Ascott or Antony Ascot.

Life and career 
Born in Bari, Carmineo started his career as assistant director for, among others, Giorgio Simonelli and Camillo Mastrocinque. He made his directorial debut as co-director, alongside George Sherman, of the international co-production Panic Button, later focused on genre films, especially Spaghetti Westerns and commedie sexy all'italiana. He died in Rome on 10 September 2016.

Selected filmography 

 1968 – The Moment to Kill
 1968 – Find a Place to Die
 1969 – I am Sartana, Your Angel of Death
 1970 – Sartana's Here... Trade Your Pistol for a Coffin
 1970 – Have a Good Funeral, My Friend... Sartana Will Pay
 1970 – Light the Fuse... Sartana Is Coming
 1971 – They Call Me Hallelujah
 1971 – The Case of the Bloody Iris
 1971 – They Call Him Cemetery
 1972 – His Name Was Holy Ghost 
 1972 – Return of Halleluja 
 1973 – Holy God, Here Comes the Passatore!
 1973 – Man Named Invincible
 1973 – Anna, quel particolare piacere
 1974 – Poker in Bed
 1975 – Convoy Buddies
 1976 – Carioca tigre
 1976 – The Diamond Peddlers
 1978 – L'insegnante balla... con tutta la classe
 1981 – Pierino medico della Saub
 1981 – I carabbimatti
 1981 – Mia moglie torna a scuola
 1983 – Zero in condotta
 1983 – Exterminators of the Year 3000
 1988 – Ratman

References

External links 
 
 Giuliano Carnimeo at The New York Times 

1932 births
People from Bari
Italian film directors
Italian screenwriters
2016 deaths
Giallo film directors
Spaghetti Western directors
Italian male screenwriters